The Rock Mill Covered Bridge, on State Route 41 at Rock Mill, Ohio in Bloom Township, Fairfield County, Ohio, is a Queen Post truss bridge.  It was listed on the National Register of Historic Places in 1976.

It is a single-span wooden covered bridge spanning a deep gorge of the Hocking River.

References

External links

Covered bridges in Ohio
National Register of Historic Places in Fairfield County, Ohio
Infrastructure completed in 1901